The Yaquis de Obregón are a professional baseball team in the Mexican Pacific League based in Ciudad Obregón, Sonora. The “Yaquis” are the only team in league history to have won three consecutive league championships, achieving this feat in the 2010–11, 2011–12 and 2012–13 seasons.

History
Professional baseball in Ciudad Obregón dates back to 1947, when the first club was established, nicknamed Arroceros (Rice Growers). In 1958 they changed its nickname to Rojos (Reds) and in 1964 to Trigueros (Wheat Growers).

The Yaquis de Obregón were founded in 1970 and played its first game on 8 October 1970 in the Estadio Tomás Oroz Gaytán.

The team gas had 6 championships. The first one was in the 1965–1966 season with Mexican Manuel Magallón as coach. The next two titles were on the 1972–1973 season under Dave Garcia from the United States and the 1980–1981 season under Lee Sigman. On 27 January 2008 the team won their fourth championship, defeating Venados de Mazatlán four games to one, with Mexican Homar Rojas as manager.

Managed by Domincan Eddie Díaz, the team won the 2010-11 championship, defeating Algodoneros de Guasave four games to three, and went on to win the 2011 Caribbean Series contested in Mayagüez, Puerto Rico. The team won a second and third consecutive title after winning the 2011-2012 and 2012-2013 championships under Díaz. Later, they went on to win the 2013 Caribbean Series. The 2013 Caribbean Series was the first to feature a final game after a Round-robin tournament. The final game lasted 18 inning ending at 2 am local time. They are the first team in the Liga Mexicana del Pacífico to win three championships in a row.

Famous Players
 Vinicio Castilla
 Francisco "Paquín" Estrada
 Chris Coste
 Douglas Clark
 Eddie Diaz 
 Felipe "Clipper" Montemayor

Infielders
 Willie Aikens
 Juan Navarrete
 Aurelio Rodríguez
 Alfredo Amézaga
 Agustin Murillo

Outfielders
 Jerry Turner
 Karim García
 Dusty Baker

Pitchers
 Enrique Romo
 Sean Nolin

Results from all seasons

Roster

References

External links
  Official site.
 Estadio Tomás Oroz Gaytán at the World Stadiums website.

Obregon Yaquis
Sports teams in Sonora
Baseball teams established in 1970
1970 establishments in Mexico